Winnica  is a village in Pułtusk County, Masovian Voivodeship, in east-central Poland. It is the seat of the gmina (administrative district) called Gmina Winnica.

References

villages in Pułtusk County